The Duke Blue Devils baseball team is the varsity intercollegiate baseball program of Duke University, based in Durham, North Carolina, United States.  The team has been a member of the Atlantic Coast Conference since the conference's founding in the 1954 season. The program's home venue is the Durham Bulls Athletic Park, which opened in 1995.  Chris Pollard has been the head coach of the team since the 2013 season. As of the end of the 2019 season, the Blue Devils have appeared in three College World Series in nine NCAA Tournaments. They have won three ACC Championships. As of the start of the 2021 Major League Baseball season, 36 former Blue Devils players have played in Major League Baseball.

History
The baseball program began varsity play in 1889. Led by Arthur Bradsher's 13–1 record they won the S.I.A.A. championship in 1904. The Trinity hurler struck out 169 batters during that championship season and walked only four batters the entire season.

The vast majority of the program's successes came under head coaches Jack Coombs and Ace Parker from 1929–1966. Coombs led the Blue Devils to five Southern Conference championships and to a fifth-place finish in the 1952 College World Series. Taking over upon Coombs' retirement after the 1952 season, Parker led Duke to the 1953 and 1961 College World Series, one Southern Conference championship, and three Atlantic Coast Conference championships. In 2016, Duke earned their first bid to the NCAA Tournament since their 1961 College World Series run, ending a 55-year drought. Head coach Chris Pollard continued this success, leading the Blue Devils to the NCAA Super Regionals in 2018 and 2019. In 2021, the Blue Devils defeated NC State at the 2021 ACC Tournament, winning their first ever ACC Championship.

Steroid controversy
In 2005, the program was the target of a controversy involving the use of anabolic steroids. Five former players told the Duke Chronicle that head coach Bill Hillier had pressured players to use steroids, with two of those players admitting to having injected steroids in 2002. In an open letter published in the Chronicle, another former player, Evan Anderson, confirmed that Hillier had pressured players to use steroids. While Hillier denied the accusations, he was replaced as head coach after the 2005 season.

Conference affiliations
 Southern Conference − 1929–1953
 Atlantic Coast Conference − 1954–present

Head coaches

Year by year record

NCAA Tournament record

Individual awards
ACC Baseball Player of the Year
Ryan Jackson (1994) 

ACC Baseball Coach of the Year 
Tom D'Armi (1981) 
Steve Traylor (1992)

Current and former major league players

 Wayne Ambler
 Bob Brower
 Greg Burke
 Chris Capuano
 Bobby Coombs
 Claude Corbitt
 John Courtright
 Brandy Davis
 Crash Davis
 Ron Davis
 Mort Flohr
 Nate Freiman
 Lee Griffeth
 Dick Groat
 Alex Hassan 
 Bryce Jarvis 
 Ryan Jackson
 Footer Johnson
 Wade Lefler
 Bill McCahan
 Quinton McCracken
 Tim McKeithan
 Pete Naktenis
 Dan Otero
 Ace Parker
 John Poff 
 Graeme Stinson 
 Scott Schoeneweis
 Frank Seward
 Eddie Shokes
 Dave Smith
 Al Spangler
 Marcus Stroman
 Eric Tipton
 Mike Trombley
 Hal Wagner
 Ken Weafer
 Billy Werber

Major league Baseball Draft

2019 
In the 2019 MLB draft five Blue Devils were selected. Pitcher Graeme Stinson was selected 128th overall by the Tampa Bay Rays, Pitcher Ben Gross was selected by the Minnesota Twins, Kennie Taylor was taken in the 14th round by New York Mets, Adam Laskey was chosen 582nd overall by the Chicago Cubs, and Bryce Jarvis was drafted in the 37th round by the New York Yankees, but  chose not to sign and returned to Duke.

2020 
In the 2020 MLB draft three Blue Devils were selected. Junior Pitcher Bryce Jarvis was selected 18th overall by the Arizona Diamondbacks, Jordan Walker was selected 21st overall by the St. Louis Cardinals Evan Carter was chosen 50th overall by the Texas Rangers

World Series Champions 
Dick Groat (1960, 1964 – Pittsburgh Pirates, St. Louis Cardinals) 
Scott Schoeneweis (2002 – Anaheim Angels)

See also
 List of NCAA Division I baseball programs
 Duke Blue Devils

References